The canal containing the nasolacrimal duct is called the nasolacrimal canal.

It is formed by indentations in the inferior nasal conchae, maxilla and lacrimal bone. The canal drains into the nasal cavity through the anterior portion of the inferior meatus, which is between the inferior concha and the floor of the nasal cavity.

See also
 Orbit (anatomy)

Additional images

External links
  - "Orbits and Eye: Orbital openings and related anatomical features"

Human head and neck